Shaukeen Kaminay is a 2016 contemporary Indian film, directed by Anil Chorasiya.  The directorial debut is a Hindi language film. The film is produced under MFA Motion Pictures by Brajesh Pandey.

Cast
 Narendra Tiwari as Som
 Kartik Gaur as Hardik
 Sahil Garg as Sunny
 Vanshika Gupta as Sonali
 Yasmin Pathan as Divya
 Priyanka Singh as Pallavi
 Pramod Shukla as Phundru
 Manisha Singh as Sheela
 Seema Billong as Kalawati
 Vandana as Riya

Production
The filming of Shaukeen Kaminay started on 15 January 2015. The film was shot in Mumbai, Varanasi, Ghazipur, Mahabaleshwar and Goa.

Soundtrack 
Music of Shaukeen Kaminay was launched on 8 March 2016. The film has four songs. Music for the film is composed by Rajib-Mouna and Dharam Dewda . Lyrics for the songs are written by Dharam Dewda, Brajesh Pandey and Allahmeher Malik. Aman Trikha, Javed Ali and Mohammad Irfan have sung the songs for the album.

Reception
The Free Press Journal called the film "A bad joke."

References

External links

2016 films
2010s Hindi-language films
Indian drama films
2016 drama films
Hindi-language drama films